South West Africa is the former name of Namibia. It may refer to:

 German South West Africa (1884–1915), under German control
 South West Africa (1915–1990), under South African control